Transportation in Ecuador can be summarized in the following areas: aviation, highways, pipelines, ports and harbors, railways, and waterways. Apart from transporting passengers, the country is a relatively small exporter of, alongside fruits and vegetables such as Banana's, Papaya's and Pineapples.

Aviation

National airlines
Avianca
LATAM Airlines

Airports

359 (2006 est.)

Airports (paved)
total: 98
over 3,047 m: 3
2,438 to 3,047 m: 4
1,524 to 2,437 m: 19
914 to 1,523 m: 29
under 914 m: 43

Airports (unpaved)
total: 261
914 to 1,523 m:33
under 914 m:228

Heliports
2 (2010)

Highways

total: 
paved: 
unpaved:  (2004 est.)

The Sierra Region still plays an important role in transportation throughout the country. The Pan-American Highway crosses it from north to south. Ecuador has managed to update some roads into four-lane freeways:

 Quito – Alpichacas. Length: 33 km.
 Guayaquil ring-road. Length: 46 km.
 Guayaquil – Taura. Length: 30 km.
 Guayaquil – Cerro Blanco. Length: 27 km.
 Machala – Pasaje. Length: 23 km.

Bus transport
Bus transport in Ecuador

Pipelines
 crude oil 800 km
 petroleum products 1,358 km

Ports and harbors

Pacific Ocean 
 Esmeraldas
 Guayaquil, La Libertad
 Manta
 Puerto Bolívar
 San Lorenzo

Merchant marine
total:
31 ships ( or over) totaling /
ships by type: (2006 est.)
 Chemical tanker 1
 gas carrying tanker 1
 Passenger ships 7
 Petroleum tankers 21
 Specialized tanker 1
Foreign-owned: 2
 Norway 1,
 Paraguay 1
Registered in other countries 1
 Georgia 1

Railways

Total:
812 km (single track)
Narrow gauge:
812 km of  gauge.

All services ceased in 2020.

Proposals 
There is a proposed rail connection with Colombia. On 5 July 2008, a meeting took place between Venezuela, Colombia and Ecuador regarding a railway for freight and passengers to link the three countries, and linking the Pacific with the Atlantic also. There is no railway service to Peru.

Metro services 
In 2020, the Cuenca Tramway (Tranvía Cuenca), the first modern rail transit line in Ecuador, opened for service.

The Quito Metro is expected to open in late 2022.

Waterways

References

 Useful tips and articles about transportation in Ecuador

External links